Delmon University for Science & Technology (often shortened to Delmon University) was a private university in Manama, Bahrain.

The university was originally conceived in 2003 by its founder, Dr Hassan Al-Qadhi. It was licensed to operate on 6 July 2004. The name derives from Delmon or Dilmun, a land mentioned by Ancient Iraqi civilizations as a source of raw material, which has been speculated to have been in Bahrain.

Degree programs included a Bachelor of Arts in Business Administration.

In 2013, the university's licence was revoked by the Higher Education Council of the Bahraini government. A court case to reverse this decision was lost in 2017.

References

External links
 Delmon University for Science & Technology website, archived by Archive.org (2013)

2003 establishments in Bahrain
2013 disestablishments in Bahrain
Educational institutions established in 2003
Educational institutions disestablished in 2013
Universities in Bahrain
Technical universities and colleges
Buildings and structures in Manama
Education in Manama
Organisations based in Manama
Defunct organisations based in Bahrain
Former for-profit universities and colleges